Sivapterodon ("Shiva's Pterodon") is an extinct genus of hyainailourid hyaenodont mammal of the polyphyletic tribe Hyainailourini within paraphyletic subfamily Hyainailourinae that lived in Pakistan during the middle Miocene.

Phylogeny
The phylogenetic relationships of genus Sivapterodon are shown in the following cladogram:

See also
 Mammal classification
 Hyainailourini

References

Hyaenodonts
Miocene mammals of Asia
Prehistoric placental genera